Skyclad are a British heavy metal band with heavy folk influences in their music. They are considered one of the pioneers of folk metal. The etymology behind the term "skyclad" comes from a pagan/wiccan term for ritual nudity, in which rituals are performed with the participants metaphorically clad only by the sky, as a sign of equality. The name alludes both to the band's religious leanings and to their social beliefs, as set out in the song "Skyclad" on their first album.

History 
The band was founded in 1990 by then former Sabbat vocalist Martin Walkyier and Satan/Pariah guitarist Steve Ramsey, after Walkyier left Sabbat over an argument with guitarist Andy Sneap as to the direction of the music. The two's aim was to put together the 'ultimate pagan metal band' (initial ideas for the band included such extravagances as traditional Robin Hood costumes, though these concepts were soon dropped). Rounding out the group with another ex-member of Pariah, bassist Graeme English, as well as drummer Keith Baxter, they penned a deal with German record label Noise International and recorded and released The Wayward Sons of Mother Earth in 1991. The album cover was designed by Garry Sharpe-Young.

After a tour with Overkill they added Fritha Jenkins on violin and keyboard and a second guitarist in the shape of Baxter's friend Dave Pugh, allowing for a more folk-based sound on their follow-up release A Burnt Offering for the Bone Idol in 1992. The group's early output was followed by Jonah's Ark in 1993. In 1994 the band released Prince of the Poverty Line, on which Cath Howell replaced Fritha Jenkins. Jenkins had left to have a baby, and Howell had deputised on the Jonah's Ark tour, it being Jenkins intention to return. When she elected not to do so, Howell became a permanent member.

Howell resumed her studies and was replaced by Georgina Biddle for 1995's The Silent Whales of Lunar Sea, after which both Baxter and Pugh left the group. Having a deficit of band members, the band was generally unable to tour, although they replaced Tiamat on the Black Sabbath Forbidden UK tour in 1995. This was whilst recording Irrational Anthems, which was released early the following year.

Oui Avant-Garde á Chance was recorded within the space of a year and, like Irrational Anthems used studio/session drummer Paul AT Kinson. The Answer Machine? followed in 1997 with Kinson on drums, but the band still lacked a permanent drummer,  Jay Graham and guitarist Kevin "Riddler the Fiddler" Ridley (who had previously been the band's producer, background vocalist and singer/guitarist in the punk band Forgodsake) signed on in 1998, in time to record Vintage Whine for a 1999 release.

The lineup remained stable for the recording of 2000's Folkémon, but founding member Walkyier left the band in 2001, citing various reasons, such as financial difficulties and the band's unwillingness to tour in South America owing to security concerns as the final straw, though other band members have commented that his somewhat acerbic personality was one of the major contributing factors to the group's lineup instability. Walkyier went on to form The Clan Destined. For many fans, Walkyier's lyrics and delivery style were one of the band's central  attractions, and there were fears that his departure spelled the end of the band. After replacing drummer Jay Graham (who left shortly after Walkyier) with drummer Arron Walton, and moving Kevin Ridley onto vocals, the group sprang into action to remedy these fears with 2002's No Daylights... Nor Heel Taps which featured studio recordings of "Irish Pub versions" of Skyclad classics by the new line-up, preceded by a single, 2001's "Swords of a Thousand Men". The single's title track, a cover tune (originally recorded by Tenpole Tudor), also appeared on Folkémon as a bonus track, although in a different version. The single featured two recordings of the track, one of them with Ridley on vocals and one with Ridley sharing the microphone with Ten Pole Tudor's vocalist Edward Tudor-Pole. The single/album release was accompanied by The Same...But Different tour, the largest Skyclad had undertaken for many years. Also in 2001 the band's former record label released Another Fine Mess, which featured live recordings from 1995 and the contents of the Outrageous Fourtunes EP.

After some unpleasantness between Walkyier and the other band members over copyrights and royalties for his lyrics, as well as the release of tracks featuring him, 2004's A Semblance of Normality marked the band's first new material post-Walkyier. Its style was very much in the vein of previous releases, with Ridley's lyrics making an obvious effort to follow similar themes and styles to Walkyier's whilst retaining an individual identity.

Skyclad self-released an EP, Jig-a-Jig, in 2006. A new album had been planned for the same year but Black Lotus Records went out of business just a few months after Skyclad had signed to it.

The band's twelfth studio album In The... All Together was released in spring 2009 via Scarlet Records.

In June 2012, Walkyier announced that a band called "Martin Walkyier's Skyclad" would be headlining a festival in Nottingham, England in September of that year.

Skyclad's 13th studio album Forward Into The Past was released on 28 April 2017 via Listenable Records. It is the first album since 1995's Silent Whales of Lunar Sea to feature second guitarist Dave Pugh, who returned to Skyclad as a full member in 2014.

Band members

Current members 
 Steve Ramsey (guitar) since 1990 (also in Satan, Pariah, Blind Fury)
 Graeme "Bean" English (bass, acoustic guitar) since 1990 (also in Satan, Pariah, Blind Fury)
 Dave Pugh (guitar) 1991–1995, since 2014
 Georgina Biddle (violin) since 1994
 Kevin Ridley (vocals since 2001, keyboard, guitar since 1998, producer since 1990)
 Arron Walton (drums) since 2001

Former members 
 Jay Graham (drums) 1998–2001
 Martin Walkyier (vocals, lyrics) 1990–2000 (also in The Clan Destined, Sabbat)
 Nick Acons (guitar, violin) 1997
 John Leonard (flute, banjo, mandolin) 1997 (Now with Ferocious Dog)
 Mitch Oldham (drums) 1997
 Dave Moore (session guitar) 1996 (ex-Velvet Viper)
 Paul A.T. Kinson (drums) 1996
 Paul Smith (drums) 1996
 Dave Ray (guitar) 1995
 Jed Dawkins (drums) 1995
 Keith Baxter (drums) 1990–1995
 Fritha Jenkins (violin, mandolin, keyboards) 1991–1993
 Cath Howell (violin) 1993–1994
 Danny Porter (session guitar) 1991-1991 (Also in Ruiner)

Timeline

Discography

Studio albums 
 The Wayward Sons of Mother Earth (1991)
 A Burnt Offering for the Bone Idol (1992)
 Jonah's Ark (1993)
 Prince of the Poverty Line (1994)
 The Silent Whales of Lunar Sea (1995)
 Irrational Anthems (1996)
 Oui Avant-Garde á Chance (1996)
 The Answer Machine? (1997)
 Vintage Whine (1999)
 Folkémon (2000)
 A Semblance of Normality (2004)
 In the... All Together (2009)
 Forward into the Past (2017)

Compilations and live albums 
 Old Rope compilation (1996)
 Poetic Wisdom Compilation (limited tour Greek edition) (2001)
 Another Fine Mess live album (2001)
 Live at the Dynamo compilation/live album (2002)
 History Lessens compilation (2002)
 No Daylights... Nor Heel Taps compilation/re-recording (2002)

Singles and EPs 
 Tracks from the Wilderness EP (1992)
 "Thinking Allowed?" (1993)
 Outrageous Fourtunes limited edition EP (1998)
 Classix Shape limited edition EP (1999)
 "Swords of a Thousand Men" (2001)
 Jig-a-Jig limited edition EP (2006)

Videos 
 "Emerald" (1992)
 "Thinking Allowed?" (1993)
 "Inequality Street" (1996)
 "Words Upon the Street" directed by Fernando J. Martínez (2009)
 "Change Is Coming" directed by Fernando J. Martínez (2017)
 "Starstruck?" directed by Fernando J. Martínez (2017)
 "Words Fail Me" directed by Fernando J. Martínez (2018)

References

External links 

 Official website

English folk metal musical groups
Musical groups from Newcastle upon Tyne
Musical groups established in 1990
Nuclear Blast artists
Massacre Records artists
Noise Records artists
Scarlet Records artists
Listenable Records artists